Kanwal Shauzab is a Pakistani politician who has been a member of the National Assembly of Pakistan since August 2018.

Early life and education
She was born in 1973 to a Pakistan Army officer in Sargodha, She belongs to a pure Punjabi family. She speaks English, Urdu and Punjabi fluently.

She holds a Masters degree from the National University of Modern Languages in English Literature and M.Phil from the Quaid-i-Azam University, which she completed in 2015.

Political career
She joined Pakistan Tehreek-e-Insaf (PTI) in 1997.

She also ran for Senate in 2018 on a PTI ticket but was unsuccessful.

She was elected to the National Assembly of Pakistan as a candidate of PTI on a reserved seat for women from Punjab in the 2018 Pakistani general election.

On 7 September 2018, she was appointed as Parliamentary Secretary for Planning, Development, and Reforms.

In April 2022, she also resigned from the National Assembly seat along with all PTI  members after the No-confidence motion against Imran Khan was successful.

Allegations of abuse of power and torture
In September 2020, a citizen of Islamabad Sector F-11/2 petitioned the Islamabad Sessions Court to request registration of a criminal complaint against Shauzab. The petition alleged that Shauzab used Capital Development Authority to landscape and clean up an area around Shauzab's newly-purchased house; and that on 30 September 2020, she trespassed on private property to torture a 67-year-old neighbor.

Additional Session Judge Syed Faizan Haider approved the petition on 19 January 2021, and ordered that the appropriate police FIR be registered against the PTI Member National Assembly (MNA) according to the law.

External links
 National Assembly profile

See also
 List of members of the 15th National Assembly of Pakistan
 List of Pakistan Tehreek-e-Insaf elected members (2013–2018)
 No-confidence motion against Imran Khan

References

Living people
1982 births
Pakistani MNAs 2018–2023
Pakistan Tehreek-e-Insaf MNAs
Quaid-i-Azam University alumni
Women members of the National Assembly of Pakistan
21st-century Pakistani women politicians